The Adrian Brewer Studio is a historic artist's studio at 510 Cedar Street in Little Rock, Arkansas.  It is an architectural blend of Moderne and Arts and Crafts styling, designed in collaboration by Max Mayer and George Trapp and built in 1945 for one of Arkansas' leading artists of the period, Adrian Brewer.  The building features masonry construction with heavy wooden timber elements, an entrance trellis made out of repurposed railroad ties, and a door made of pecky cypress wood.  The studio is the only major surviving space associated with the artist.

The building was listed on the National Register of Historic Places in 2000.

See also
National Register of Historic Places listings in Little Rock, Arkansas

References

Houses on the National Register of Historic Places in Arkansas
Streamline Moderne architecture in the United States
Houses completed in 1945
Houses in Little Rock, Arkansas
National Register of Historic Places in Little Rock, Arkansas
1945 establishments in Arkansas